The Döbling Cemetery (Döblinger Friedhof) is a cemetery in the 19th district of Döbling in Vienna, Austria.

Location 
The cemetery lies in the south of Döbling on the border to Währing in the Katastralgemeinde of Oberdöbling, in the Hartäckerstraße. The cemetery's limits are defined in the south by the Peter-Jordan-Straße, in the west by the Borkowskigasse and in the north by the Hartäckergasse. It thus covers an area of 49,981 m2 and provides space for 6853 plots.

History

Older cemeteries in Döbling 
Traditionally, Unterdöbling’s dead were buried at the Heiligenstadt cemetery, while those from Oberdöbling were buried around the Döbling Parish Church. The latter was expanded in 1781; records exist of its use until 1783. When the church was torn down and rebuilt in 1826, the graveyard was presumably abandoned.

A new cemetery was founded to replace the graveyard in the course of the elevation of Döbling to an independent parish. This new cemetery was designed to accommodate not just Oberdöbling’s dead, but also those from Unterdöbling, which had been included in the new parish. The cemetery was created at the edge of Unterdöbling, on the road to Grinzing (today known as the Billrothstraße), but it had to be closed in 1885 as it neared capacity. The area was transformed into the Strauss-Lanner-Park in 1928.

The Döbling Cemetery 

Permission to found a new cemetery was granted to the communities of Oberdöbling and Unterdöbling by the imperial district authorities in Hernals on 28 April 1880. The site chosen for the new cemetery covered a rhomboid-shaped area 7.5 jochs in size (a Joch is an old measurement equivalent to 0.5755 hectares in Austria) on the Türkenschanze. The cemetery was designed by architects Avanzo and Lange to hold 30,000 graves. It was officially opened on 10 June 1885 by the Döbling parish priest, Dr. Hulesch.

The Döbling Cemetery was open to believers of all confessions. A Jewish section was opened in 1888, and on 13 February 1894, the city authorities approved the creation of a burial site for Muslim soldiers of the imperial territorial army. The Muslim section covered an area of 404.4 m2 with space for 40 individual graves. Its use for Muslim burials was approved for a period of 20 years; it was expanded by a further 157 m2 in 1900. In addition to members of these minorities and the dead from Oberdöbling and Unterdöbling, the cemetery also provided space for deceased persons from Vienna, as many did not want to be buried at the city's main cemetery, the Zentralfriedhof and the surrounding suburbs could charge a premium price for the service.

Expansion of the cemetery 
The Döbling Cemetery was expanded between 1899 and 1901 by 15,584 m2 onto land that was either bought or repossessed for this purpose. The site was expanded by a further 9334 m2 to 57,271 m2 in 1906. The Jewish section was enlarged into an unused section of the cemetery at the same time. The morgue was renovated between 1907 and 1908 and a chapel was built for consecrations. Thereafter, the Döbling Cemetery could not be expanded any further, so in 1911, it was decided to use the Grinzing Cemetery as a replacement. From April 1917, there were no more spaces in the Döbling Cemetery, and Döbling's dead had to be buried in Grinzing. Only after the ministry for military affairs decided to cease burying Muslim soldiers in Döbling in 1920 was it possible to use space in the cemetery allocated for this purpose for Christian graves instead, although the plots were not prepared until 1929 - 1931. When the cemetery was renovated in 1961, plots which had fallen into decay were freed up for reuse.

The morgue 
The morgue was renovated in 1925; a second holding room was also added at this time. Further work was conducted in 1931. In 1969, a refrigeration facility was added in the treatment room. Between 1971 and 1972, the storage hall was redesigned in accordance with plans drawn up by architect Erich Boltenstern. The rear wall of the apse was decorated by painter Hermann Bauch. The storage room, which was conceived to permit the holding of cremation ceremonies, has space for up to 160 people.

Graves of famous persons

Graves dedicated in honour of well known individuals (see Ehrengrab) 

The Döbling Cemetery contains 67 graves dedicated in honour of notable individuals.

Other graves of famous persons

Other famous people buried in Döbling are:

References

Further reading 
 Felix Czeike: Historisches Lexikon Wien, Band 2. Verlag Kremayr & Scheriau, Wien 1993, p. 46f. 
 Werner T. Bauer: Wiener Friedhofsführer. Genaue Beschreibung sämtlicher Begräbnisstätten nebst einer Geschichte des Wiener Bestattungswesens. Falter Verlag, Wien 2004, . 
 Tim Corbett: “Was ich den Juden war, wird eine kommende Zeit besser beurteilen...”. Myth and Memory at Theodor Herzl's Original Gravesite in Vienna, in: S:I.M.O.N. SHOAH: INTERVENTION. METHODS. DOCUMENTATION 3 (2016) 1, 64-88: https://simon-ojs.vwi.ac.at/index.php/simon/issue/view/8

External links 

 Döblinger Friedhof 

Cemeteries in Vienna
Religion in Vienna
Buildings and structures in Döbling